Legio X (10th Legion) may refer to:

 Julius Caesar's Legio X Equestris, also known as Legio X Veneria;
 Augustus's Legio X Gemina, which resulted from the amalgamation of Legio X Equestris with another unknown legion;
 Legio X Fretensis, a legion widely known for the suppression of the First Jewish rebellion. This legion conquered Masada

See also
 List of Roman legions